James H. Tripp (January 17, 1832 – October 7, 1917) was an American banker, businessman, and politician from New York.

Life 
Tripp was born on January 17, 1832, in Ancram, New York, the son of Daniel A. Tripp and Loretta Haviland. Tripp moved to Dryden with his parents in 1837, followed by Harford a year later.

After graduating from Cortland Academy, Tripp spent the next five years teaching in the winter, working on his father's farm in the summer. In 1856, he moved to Marathon, where he worked as a clerk in the general store Peck & Adams. Three years later, he took an interest in the firm and it was renamed Peck, Adams, & Tripp. When the partnership was dissolved in 1862, he began working as a cashier H. J. Messenger's banking house. A few months later, he moved to Canandaigua to take charge of a bank Messenger was president of. He stayed in Messenger's employment until 1866.

In 1865, Tripp began a partnership with Lyman Adams, his former partner, and conducted a general mercantile firm under the name Tripp & Adams. In 1867, the firm began a private banking business along with the mercantile business. In 1883, they sold the mercantile business to focus exclusively on banking. In 1884, when the First National Bank of Marathon was organized, Tripp was named its president. He also served as a director of the Homer National Bank, which he helped organize. In 1897, he was a vice-president of the American Bankers Association.

In 1891, Tripp was elected to the New York State Assembly as a Republican, representing Cortland County. He served in the Assembly in 1892 and 1893.

In 1865, Tripp married Sarah Remington. She died in 1871. In 1873, he married Mrs. Louisa Bogadus nee Farrington. He adopted her daughter Anna from her first marriage.

Tripp died at home on October 7, 1917. He was buried in Marathon Cemetery.

References

External links 

 The Political Graveyard
 James H. Tripp at Find a Grave

1832 births
1917 deaths
People from Columbia County, New York
People from Cortland County, New York
American bank presidents
19th-century American politicians
Republican Party members of the New York State Assembly
Burials in New York (state)
19th-century American businesspeople